The Berlin Pride Celebration, also known as Christopher Street Day Berlin, or CSD Berlin, is a pride parade and festival held in the second half of July each year in Berlin, Germany to celebrate the lesbian, gay, bisexual, and transgender (LGBT) people and their allies. Since 1979, the event has been held each year. Berlin Pride is one of the largest gay and lesbian organized events in Germany and one of the biggest in Europe. Its aim is to demonstrate for equal rights and equal treatment for LGBT people, as well as celebrate the pride in Gay and Lesbian Culture.

History 
The CSD is held in memory of the Stonewall Riots, the first big uprising of LGBTQ people against police assaults on June 27, 1969. These took place in Christopher Street, in the neighborhood of Greenwich Village in New York City, New York.

The first CSD in Berlin took place on June 30, 1979, and since then has taken place every year. In 2012, around 700,000 people attended the CSD Parade, and 500,000 people were present at the final parade location at the Brandenburg Gate, making it into one of the largest events in Berlin as well as one of the largest Pride Events in the world.

Events 
CSD Berlin comprises several events, taking place within the framework of the month-long Pride Festival, usually starting at the end of May. Pride Week is the final week of the festival, ending with the CSD Parade. The CSD Gala has been taking place since 2011, and is organised in co-operation with the Friedrichstadt Show Palace.

In the same month both Kreuzberg Pride and Gay Night at the Zoo are held. More gay festivals in Berlin include Folsom Europe, and Easter in Berlin.

Organization 
All CSD events are organised by the Berliner CSD e.V. (Berlin LGBT Pride Association). The organization was formed at the end of 1999. The association was meant to relieve the three previous coordinators: the "Sonntags-Club", "LSVD" and "Mann-o-Meter", who had been organizing the "CSD Berlin" from 1994 to 1999.

Each year, the theme, motto and political demands of the CSD Parade are determined in so-called Pride Forums. These are open meetings that can be attended by anyone.

See also 

 LGBT rights in Germany
 Lesbian and Gay City Festival

References

External links 

 CSD Berlin

LGBT events in Berlin
Pride parades in Germany
Culture in Berlin
Tourist attractions in Berlin
Parades in Berlin
Annual events in Berlin
Summer events in Germany